Toledo is a Colombian municipality and town located in the department of North Santander. It is on the border with Boyacá Department and has natural gas development in the township of Gibraltar. In August 2011 the Gibraltar to Bucaramanga gas pipeline was completed.

Townships (corregimientos)
 Gibraltar
 Samoré
 San Bernardo

Climate
Toledo has a very wet subtropical highland climate (Cfb). It has heavy rainfall from November to February and very heavy to extremely heavy rainfall from April to October.

Notes

References
 
 

Municipalities of the Norte de Santander Department